The Schock 40 is an American sailboat that was designed by DynaYacht as a racer and first built in 2000.

Production
The design was built by W. D. Schock Corp in the United States, starting in 2000, with ten boats built, but it is now out of production.

Design
The Schock 40 is a racing keelboat, built predominantly of fiberglass. It has a masthead sloop rig with a carbon fiber mast and an aluminum boom, a plumb stem with a retractable  bowsprit and a reverse transom. It uses DynaYacht's patented CBTF (canting ballast twin foil) system, which greatly reduces the amount of ballast required and thus the overall boat weight. The weighted bulb can be canted up to 55 degrees either side of the boat's plumb line, using a hydraulic cylinder which is actuated by an electric motor, button-controlled from the cockpit helm position. It has dual fore-and-aft linked rudders, displaces  and carries  of lead ballast.

The boat is normally fitted with an outboard motor for docking and maneuvering.

The design has a minimalist interior, with stand-up headroom, sleeping accommodation consisting of two settee berths in the main cabin and a fully enclosed head.

For sailing downwind the design may be equipped with an asymmetrical spinnaker.

Operational history
In a 2001 review in Sailing World Peter Danjou wrote, "I test-sailed the Schock 40 in San Pedro, Calif., during the Cabrillo Beach YC's Winter Series and can report the new boat is light, narrow, and very fast. The PHRF rating of -6 for wind-ward/leeward racing only begins to tell the story. I wouldn't have believed it if I hadn't seen it with my own eyes, but this 40-foot displacement boat beat an 18-foot skiff (sailed by Howard Hamlin) to the second weather mark in 12 to 15 knots of breeze."

See also
List of sailing boat types

References

External links

Keelboats
2000s sailboat type designs
Sailing yachts
Sailboat type designs by DynaYacht
Sailboat types built by W. D. Schock Corp